The Stawell Football Club is an Australian rules football club which competes in the Wimmera Football League (WFL). It is based in the town of Stawell, Victoria.

In 1998 they merged with the Stawell Warriors Football Club, Before the merger, Stawell were nicknamed the Redlegs.

VFL/AFL footballers recruited from Stawell include Ken Beck, Craig Ellis and Liam Pickering.

The Warriors 
The Warriors and Stawell Swifts both came into being in 1926 when the Stawell Junior Football Club was split into two. The two clubs were part of the Stawell DFA that was a forerunner to the South Wimmera Football League that commenced in 1929. The Warriors won flags in 1932, 1933, 1934, 1939, 1946, 1947, 1948, 1954, 1955, 1961, 1965 and 1968.

Both teams commenced in the Ararat District Football Association (ADFA) in 1970 after their previous competition disbanded at the end of 1969. The Warriors won flags in 1978, 1981, 1982, 1984,1995 and 1996.

The Warriors were blocked by the ADFA from merging with Stawell so they took the drastic step of disbanding. Stawell absorbed the remnants of the Warriors club.

References

Australian rules football clubs established in 1874
Wimmera Football League clubs
1874 establishments in Australia
Stawell, Victoria